Takashi Kobayashi may refer to:

  (born 1965), member of Japanese rock band The Boom
 Takashi Kobayashi (racing driver) (born 1987), Japanese racing driver
 Takashi Kobayashi (wrestler) (born 1963), Japanese Olympic wrestler